The Canal Derby is a football match between the Egyptian clubs Al-Masry SC and Ismaily SC. It is a match between arguably the two biggest and most popular clubs in the Suez Canal region in Egypt. Al-Masry SC is located in Port Said while Ismaily SC is based in Ismailia. Usually the Derby is played twice each season with 2 matches in the Egyptian Premier League, but it is not uncommon to find the teams meeting each other in the Egypt Cup.

The rivalry

Ever since their creation, both clubs have been the top clubs in the Suez Canal region, they were competing in the Canal Zone League before the commence of the Egyptian Premier League.

The largest winning margin in this derby was 7–2 for Al-Masry in 1934 Sultan Hussien Cup Quarter Final and also 6–1 for Al-Masry in 1944 Egypt Cup Quarter Final, meanwhile the largest winning margin in the league matches was 5–0 for Ismaily in 1997–98 Egyptian Premier League.

Despite some sporadic clashes that may take place between fans during their matches, both sides have good relations in general due to the common history, strong social relations between the residents of their cities and the unity of the two clubs and their fans against the hegemony of the biggest two clubs in Egypt (Al Ahly SC and Zamalek SC).

Statistics

Top goalscorers

Honours

References

External links
History of the Canal Derby

Football rivalries in Egypt
Sports clubs in Egypt
Al Masry SC
Port Said
1930 establishments in Egypt